A favourite or favorite is the intimate companion of a ruler or other important person.

Favorite or favourite may also refer to:

General meanings
 Internet bookmark or favorite
 In sports betting, the horse, team or person etc. thought most likely to win

People 
 Favorite (rapper) (born 1986), German rapper
 Eileen Favorite (born 1964)
 Malaika Favorite (born 1949), American visual artist and writer
 Marlon Favorite (born 1986), American football defensive tackle

Places 
 Favorite Channel
 Favorite Island, an island in Western Australia
 Schloss Favorite (disambiguation)

Vessels 
 Favorite (Q195), an Aurore-class submarine of the French navy
 Favorite (steamboat), which operated in Oregon, United States, in the early 20th century
 HMS Favourite or Favorite, ships of the Royal Navy
 , a tugboat of the U.S. Navy
 French ship Favorite
 MV Favorite, an American excursion boat that capsized on July 28, 1927

Other uses
 "Favorite" (Loona song), a 2018 song
 "Favorite (Vampire)", a 2021 song by K-pop sub-unit group NCT 127

See also
 The Favorite (disambiguation)
 Favorit (disambiguation)
 Favor (disambiguation)
 Favorites (disambiguation)
 Favorite Son (disambiguation)
 Favoritism (disambiguation)
 In-group favoritism, favoring members of one's own group